The Portuguese Volleyball Federation (FPV) (in Portuguese: Federação Portuguesa de Voleibol) is the governing body of volleyball in Portugal. It is based in Porto.

Male Competitions
It organizes the volleyball leagues:
 Campeonato Nacional de Voleibol - 1ª Divisão
 Campeonato Nacional de Voleibol - A2 (defunct)
 2ª Divisão de Voleibol
 3ª Divisão de Voleibol
 Taça de Portugal de Voleibol
 Supertaça de Voleibol

Female Competitions
 Campeonato Nacional Feminino de Voleibol - A1
 Campeonato Nacional Feminino de Voleibol - A2
 2a Divisão Feminina de Voleibol
 Taça de Portugal Feminina de Voleibol

More information
It also organizes the Portugal men's national volleyball team and the Portuguese national women's volleyball team. It is a member of the Fédération Internationale de Volleyball and the Confédération Européenne de Volleyball.

References

External links
 Portuguese Volleyball Federation

National members of the European Volleyball Confederation
Volleyball
Volleyball in Portugal